USS Maricopa County (LST-938) was an  built for the United States Navy during World War II. Like many of her class, she was not named and is properly referred to by her hull designation. She was later named after Maricopa County, Arizona, she was the only US Naval vessel to bear the name.

Construction
LST-938 was laid down on 14 July 1944, at Hingham, Massachusetts, by the Bethlehem-Hingham Shipyard; launched on 15 August 1944; and commissioned on 9 September 1944.

Service history

World War II
After completing her shakedown in Chesapeake Bay, she was assigned to the 7th Fleet. With  aboard, she departed New York on 18 October 1944, and rendezvoused with a convoy near Guantánamo en route the South Pacific. Pausing briefly in the New Hebrides, LST-938 sailed on to Seeadler Harbor, Admiralty Islands, and commenced unloading on 16 December.

Having taken on supplies for a PT base on 7 January 1945, she joined a convoy for the partially liberated Philippines, where she operated for next four months.

On 10 March, elements of the 41st Infantry Division were put ashore at Zamboanga on the southwest tip of Mindanao. Further south an invasion was pending and on 28 April, LST-938 departed Leyte and steamed to Cairns, Australia. Illustrating the cooperative nature of the war effort, LST-938 transported elements of the Australian 7th Infantry Division to the assault beaches at Balikpapan, Borneo, Dutch East Indies. Unscathed after the landing operations of 1 July, and the follow-up resupply missions, she returned to the Philippines on 27 July.

Post-war activities
As the war ended, the ship embarked occupation troops and discharged them at Tokyo on 15 September. LST-938 continued to serve in the Japanese occupation until 30 November. Her next assignment placed her on duty along the China coast until 13 May 1946. The ship then departed Tsingtao and returned to the United States.

From her arrival on the east coast on 12 July 1946, until December 1949, LST-938 served as Naval Reserve training ship first at Bayonne, New Jersey, and later at Gulfport, Mississippi. She was deactivated at Green Cove Springs, Florida, where she was decommissioned and assigned to the Atlantic Reserve Fleet.

Korean War era
War in Korea saw her reactivated, and she was recommissioned 14 December 1951. LST-938 was based at the Little Creek Naval Amphibious Base, Virginia, and served as a Marine Corps training ship. During the next 4½ years she carried out operations from Greenland to the Caribbean area.

On 1 July 1955 she was named Maricopa County.

Decommissioning and transfer
Following an inactivation overhaul at New York she reached Green Cove Springs on 2 December 1955, and decommissioned on 29 February 1956. Late in October 1961 Maricopa County was towed to Philadelphia Navy Yard and prepared for a new career.

Republic of Vietnam service
Struck from the Navy List on 1 June 1962, she was transferred to the Republic of Vietnam and commissioned in the Republic of Vietnam Navy as RVNS Da Nang (HQ-501) on 12 July 1962.

Capture by the Democratic Republic of Vietnam
Captured by the North Vietnamese around the time of the fall of Saigon, on 29 April 1975, the ship was placed in service with the Vietnamese People's Navy and renamed Tran Khanh Du (HQ-501). Vietnam used her to land troops in Cambodia in its war against the Khmer Rouge.

Awards
LST-938 earned two battle stars for World War II service.

Notes

Citations

Bibliography 

Online resources

External links
 

 

LST-542-class tank landing ships
World War II amphibious warfare vessels of the United States
Cold War amphibious warfare vessels of the United States
Maricopa County, Arizona
Ships transferred from the United States Navy to the Republic of Vietnam Navy
Ships of the Vietnam People's Navy
Ships built in Hingham, Massachusetts
1944 ships